Chrysopidia is a green lacewing genus in the subfamily Chrysopinae.

Species

References

External links

Chrysopidae
Neuroptera genera